Lu Jia (died 170 BC) was a Chinese philosopher and politician of the Western Han dynasty. He secured the nominal geopolitical submission of Zhao Tuo's kingdom of Nanyue to Han in 196 BC.

The Book of Han credits him with having converted the Han dynasty founder Liu Bang to Confucianism. An anecdote tells that in an early meeting Liu scoffed at Lu's scholarly interests with the words "I do all my conquering from the back of my horse, what use have I for the Documents and Odes?" To which Lu replied, "once my lord is done with the conquering, does he also intend to do all his ruling from the back of his horse?" This brought Liu to a pause, and he subsequently requested that Lu compose for him a book of historical examples outlining why Qin had lost the support of the world and how Liu himself might gain and retain it. This became the 12-chapter volume known as the Xin Yu 新語 ("New Discourses").

Xin Yu integrates the concepts of yin and yang into a description of benevolent rule and its relation to self-cultivation. This combination of yin and yang with classic Confucian concept of benevolent rule was a precursor to writing of Dong Zhongshu in the Luxuriant Dew of the Spring and Autumn Annals.

References

External links
 New Discussions 新語 Original text in Chinese with embedded Chinese-English dictionary

170 BC deaths
2nd-century BC Chinese philosophers
Han dynasty philosophers
Han dynasty politicians
Nanyue